Miconia theizans (synonym Miconia theaezans) is a species of shrub or tree in the family Melastomataceae. It is native to South America.

References

theizans
Trees of Peru
Trees of Colombia
Trees of Venezuela
Taxa named by Aimé Bonpland